Bucculatrix clerotheta is a moth in the family Bucculatricidae. It was described in 1915 by Edward Meyrick. It is found in India.

References

Natural History Museum Lepidoptera generic names catalog

Bucculatricidae
Moths described in 1915
Taxa named by Edward Meyrick
Moths of Asia